Nassarius boucheti is a species of sea snail, a marine gastropod mollusk in the family Nassariidae, the Nassa mud snails or dog whelks.

Description
The length of the shell varies between 8 mm and 12 mm.

Distribution
This species occurs in the Pacific Ocean off New Caledonia, Vanuatu, Fiji and Tonga.

References

 Bouchet, P.; Fontaine, B. (2009). List of new marine species described between 2002-2006. Census of Marine Life.

Nassariidae
Gastropods described in 2004